Leangen is a railway station on the Nordland Line located in Trondheim, Norway, serving the area of Leangen. The station is served by the local trains Trøndelag Commuter Rail operated by SJ Norge. The station dates back to the construction of the Meråker Line (as the line was called then), and opened in 1882. The present station building is from 1944. Leangen serves a mostly industrial area, but there is also some housing, a shopping mall and Queen Maud's College of Early Childhood Education and the faculty of nursing at Sør-Trøndelag University College.

External links
 Jernbaneverket page on Leangen 

Railway stations on the Nordland Line
Railway stations on the Stavne–Leangen Line
Railway stations in Trondheim
Railway stations opened in 1882
1882 establishments in Norway